Ingredients of cosmetic products are listed following International Nomenclature of Cosmetic Ingredients (INCI). 
These INCI names often differ greatly from systematic chemical nomenclature or from more common trivial names.

The below tables are sorted as follows:

A

B

C

D

E

G

H

I

L

M

N

P

S

T

References

Lists of ingredients
Medicinal chemistry